Proton City (Malay: Bandar Proton) is a township with industrial, commercial and residential activities spread over 4,000 acres (16 km²) in Muallim District, Perak, Malaysia. It houses the RM1.8 billion Proton car assembly plant.

Proton City aims to be fully developed by 2020. Undertaken by Proton City Development Corp, a joint venture between DRB-HICOM and Proton itself. A core member of Proton Holdings, it started in 1996 with an initial investment of RM2.5 billion, beginning with the construction of the Proton plant. The Proton plant has a workforce of more than 2,000 and most of them are expected to live in the area. When Proton City is fully developed, it would have a population of about 240,000.

The first settlement in the area - 252 units of apartments - have been handed over to the buyers. These apartments have common facilities that include car and motorcycle parking bays, children's playground, BBQ area, car wash areas, mosque and a nursery/kindergarten on the ground floor of each block and a multipurpose hall. Parcels 19 and 20 when completed in 2007 will have 1,091 apartments, 336 units of single- and double-storey terrace houses, 86 semi-detached houses, 37 bungalows and 36 shop-offices.

Proton City is also expected to be home to students and staff of the Sultan Idris Education University (UPSI), which a few years ago was known as Sultan Idris Teachers' College. UPSI, occupying 800 acres (3.2 km²) within Proton City, is expected to have a student population of 20,000 within four years.

See also
Future City

External links
Proton City

Muallim District
Populated places in Perak